.hr is the Internet country code top-level domain (ccTLD) for Croatia.

Details 

The .hr domain is administered by CARNET (Croatian Academic and Research Network), via the CARNET DNS Committee which determines policy, and the CARNET DNS Service which handles day-to-day matters. The committee is composed of members generally associated with the academic community. Until 2010, the Service was operated by SRCE; since July 1, 2010 the service operations are divided between CARNET itself, SRCE and a variety of registrars.

Registrants are classified into a number of different groups with different rules about their domain registrations.  A requirement of connection to Croatia, such as being a citizen, permanent resident, registered company or EU company with VAT ID evidenced in the VIES system, is common to all of the categories except for the .com.hr. Third level domains (example.com.hr) are allowed to be registered for anyone in the world as long as they provide a local contact.

There are also third-level registrations including of individuals in a few specialized domains such as .iz.hr (.from.hr), and an unlimited number of registrations in .com.hr, but these are unpopular compared to the second-level names registered directly under .hr.

Statistics 
As of March 2017, around 30.33% of all the .hr domains were served via secured HTTPS protocol, with the cPanel, Inc. Certification Authority being the most popular SSL certificate. Apache is the most popular web server, serving 65.93% of the .hr domains, followed by Microsoft-IIS serving 13.23% of the total .hr domains. As of 14 December 2017 at 3PM CET, over 100,000 .hr domain names are registered.

References

External links 
 IANA .hr whois information
 .hr domain registration

Country code top-level domains
Internet in Croatia
Council of European National Top Level Domain Registries members
Computer-related introductions in 1993

sv:Toppdomän#H